William Bonnet (born 25 June 1982) is a French former professional road bicycle racer, who last rode for UCI WorldTeam . In the 2015 Tour de France, Bonnet crashed at full speed on stage 3 near Huy in Belgium after clipping wheels of a rider in front. He has suffered a multiple fracture of the second cervical vertebrae and was rushed to Paris for surgery and placed in an induced coma before any neurological damage was done. Bonnet retired from competition at the end of the 2021 season.

Major results

2000
 2nd  Team pursuit, UCI Junior Track World Championships
2003
 4th Grand Prix de la ville de Nogent-sur-Oise
2004
 1st Paris–Mantes-en-Yvelines
 10th Boucle de l'Artois
2005
 1st Stage 1 Paris–Corrèze
 4th Châteauroux Classic
 6th Overall Tour de Normandie
 7th Overall Tour du Limousin
 8th Overall Tour de Picardie
 9th Grand Prix de Denain
2006
 3rd Grand Prix de Wallonie
 5th Grand Prix de Fourmies
 7th Grand Prix de Denain
 7th Tro-Bro Léon
 7th Tour de Rijke
 9th Paris–Brussels
 10th Grote Prijs Jef Scherens
2007
 7th Dwars door Vlaanderen
 7th Tour de Vendée
2008
 1st Grand Prix de la Somme
 1st Grand Prix d'Isbergues
 7th Vattenfall Cyclassics
 8th Overall Tour du Poitou-Charentes
2009
 9th Overall Paris–Corrèze
2010
 1st Stage 2 Paris–Nice
 10th Dwars door Vlaanderen
 10th Tour of Flanders
2011
 6th E3 Prijs Vlaanderen
2016
 8th Road race, UCI Road World Championships

Grand Tour general classification results timeline

References

External links 

 
 
 

1982 births
Living people
French male cyclists
Sportspeople from Cher (department)
Cyclists from Centre-Val de Loire